The 1994 Critérium du Dauphiné Libéré was the 46th edition of the cycle race and was held from 30 May to 6 June 1994. The race started in Évian-les-Bains and finished in Chambéry. The race was won by the Swiss Laurent Dufaux of the Spanish ONCE team.

Teams
Eleven teams, containing a total of 95 riders, participated in the race:

 
 
 
 
 Collstrop–Naessens–Concorde

Route

Stages

Prologue
30 May 1994 – Évian-les-Bains,  (ITT)

Stage 1
31 May 1994 – Évian-les-Bains to Saint-Priest,

Stage 2
1 June 1994 – Charbonnières-les-Bains to Aubenas,

Stage 3
2 June 1994 – Romans-sur-Isère to Romans-sur-Isère,  (ITT)

Stage 4
3 June 1994 – Romans-sur-Isère to Échirolles,

Stage 5
4 June 1994 – Échirolles to Le Collet d'Allevard,

Stage 6
5 May 1994 – Allevard to Chambéry,

Stage 7
6 June 1994 – Chambéry to Chambéry,

General classification

References

1994
1994 in French sport
May 1994 sports events in Europe
June 1994 sports events in Europe